The Estonian Film Foundation (until 2013; , also (since 2013) Estonian Film Institute) is Estonia's public film funding organization financed from the state budget of the Republic of Estonia. Founded in 1997 by the Estonian Ministry of Culture, the foundation finances and promotes film productions where at least one of the participating producers is an independent Estonian production company. It establishes and develops international film contacts and supports the training of Estonian filmmakers and maintains the Estonian film database EFIS.

The growing activity is to make Estonian film heritage available through the film environment and streaming platform Arkaader and to develop and promote the language of the 21st century, i.e. film competence

Estonia is a member of European Film Promotion, Media Plus, European Audiovisual Observatory, and Eurimages.

On 29 April 2022, the Estonian government announced that it raised Film Estonia’s 2022 cash-rebate budget from €2 million to €5.4 million with a net impact on the local economy of at least €8 million.

References

External links
 

Film organizations in Estonia
1997 establishments in Estonia
Organizations established in 1997